Tennys Sandgren was the defending champion but chose not to defend his title.

Hugo Dellien won the title after defeating Christian Harrison 6–1, 1–6, 6–4 in the final.

Seeds

Draw

Finals

Top half

Bottom half

References
Main Draw
Qualifying Draw

2018 ATP Challenger Tour
2018 Singles